Tombleson is a surname. Notable people with the surname include:

 Esme Tombleson (1917–2010), New Zealand politician
 Lloyd Tombleson (1883–1951), American educator, farmer, and politician
 William Tombleson (1795–c. 1846), English artist